Rafael Teixeira de Souza (born 13 July 1992) in Água Boa, commonly known as Rafael Gladiador, is a Brazilian footballer who plays as a striker for Palmas.

Club career
In 2011, Rafael Gladiador signed for Bahia's first team from its reserve squad. In 36 appearances for Bahia he scored 10 goals.

On 9 January 2013, it was announced that he would join D.C. United as a young designated player on a one-year loan with a pre-negotiated option to make the move permanent. He scored his first goal for the team in his debut game on 23 March, a 2–1 home defeat to the Columbus Crew. After making four more appearances with United, Rafael suffered a concussion during training.

Rafael Gladiador and DC agreed to part ways in June 2013.

In July 2015, Rafael Gladiador transferred to China League One side Xinjiang Tianshan Leopard.

On 5 July 2019, Rafael Gladiador signed with Paços de Ferreira after a stint in Brazil with Cabofriense. However, he didn't play any games for the club, before he returned to Brazil, signing with Patrocinense in December 2019. In August 2020, he moved to Sociedade Esportiva Juventude.

Rafael joined Palmas ahead of the 2021 Campeonato Tocantinense.

International career
Rafael has represented Brazil at the under-20 level 3 times.

References

External links

Rafael Gladiador at Soccerway
Rafael Gladiador at FDB

1992 births
Living people
Brazilian footballers
Brazilian expatriate footballers
Brazil youth international footballers
Footballers at the 2011 Pan American Games
F.C. Paços de Ferreira players
Associação Desportiva Cabofriense players
Esporte Clube Bahia players
D.C. United players
Xinjiang Tianshan Leopard F.C. players
Atlético Clube Goianiense players
Tupi Football Club players
Clube Atlético Patrocinense players
Campeonato Brasileiro Série A players
Campeonato Brasileiro Série B players
Campeonato Brasileiro Série C players
Major League Soccer players
China League One players
Designated Players (MLS)
Association football forwards
Expatriate soccer players in the United States
Expatriate footballers in China
Expatriate footballers in Portugal
Expatriate footballers in Mexico
Brazilian expatriate sportspeople in the United States
Brazilian expatriate sportspeople in China
Brazilian expatriate sportspeople in Portugal
Brazilian expatriate sportspeople in Mexico
Pan American Games competitors for Brazil